This is a list of characters appearing in the novel series Overlord, written by Kugane Maruyama and illustrated by so-bin, and its anime and manga adaptations.

Great Tomb of Nazarick
The guild headquarters of the guild Ainz Ooal Gown in YGGDRASIL. After Nazarick was transported to the New World with its custom NPCs, who became sentient, Ainz began taking action to protect the tomb. However, the NPCs believed he was planning world domination and subsequently began making their own plans. By the time Ainz realized their intentions it was too late and he had no choice but to play along. This eventually led to Nazarick becoming its own nation: the Sorcerer Kingdom.

 / 

The protagonist/main character and the only remaining member of the guild, Ainz Ooal Gown. Originally he was a simple salaryman named  playing a VR online game, but after he was transported to the New World, he decides to make himself a legend in hopes of finding his old guildmates. To facilitate his search, he changes his name from Momonga to Ainz Ooal Gown. While Ainz initially accidentally set Nazarick on a course for world domination after a comment he made was misinterpreted, he slowly grows into his role as a leader after deciding to create a kingdom where humans and non-humans are equal. As he has the form of a lich, he doesn't need to eat or sleep, can't be poisoned or killed by conventional means, along with his emotions and empathy being suppressed, Ainz remembers having a "heart" and thus keeps his humanity in practice. Because of his formerly high level in YGGDRASIL, he can easily overpower even the strongest of magic casters in the New World; and while he lacks the skills of natural warriors, he compensates for it with raw strength. Over time, he has learned how to improve in fighting with physical weapons, but his greatest asset remains his strength. Ainz also has access to a wide variety of instant death and summoning spells which, though ineffective against fellow players, work very well against the inhabitants of the New World. He also has an array of items he purchased with real money back in YGGDRASIL, which give him abilities ranging from summoning extremely high-level items (most of which belong to his guildmates) from the Guild's bank to instantly cast a spell that usually has a long casting time. When Ainz travels incognito as an adventurer, he uses the alias Momon the Dark Hero.

Floor Guardians
A group of NPCs who act as bosses for each floor of Nazarick. Upon coming to the New World and becoming sentient, they gained great influence over Nazarick's affairs. They are among the most powerful beings in Nazarick, with some even exceeding Ainz in terms of pure stats. Their personalities and quirks are from the settings and background stories that were programmed into them by their creators.

A succubus and the overseer of the Floor Guardians. She takes the form of a beautiful woman with black wings and horns wearing a white dress. Her beautiful and kind appearance hides her dark personality underneath. She was originally set to be a bitch, but Ainz modified her to be deeply in love with him as a joke, as one of his very last acts before YGGDRASIL's server shutdown. As a result, upon coming to the New World, she became madly in love with him. To her great shame as a succubus, Albedo is a virgin; humorously she wishes to sleep with Ainz despite the fact it's impossible. She despises humans, viewing them as "lower lifeforms". She similarly harbors a secret hatred towards the other members of the Ainz Ooal Gown Guild for leaving Ainz. While in battle, she wears a three-layered full-plated suit of armor called Hermes Trismegistus, which repels any physical damage, and fights using a bardiche named 3F. She also possesses the World Item Ginnungagap, which can be used to devastate large areas.

The Guardian of the First, Second, and Third floors of Nazarick. She takes on the form of a beautiful vampire girl. She is set to be somewhat of a pervert and a necrophile, causing her to fall for Ainz and putting her at odds with Albedo. She is the most powerful Floor Guardian in terms of overall stats, optimized for both melee and magic combat. Due to an incident where she was brainwashed by the Slane Theocracy, she unintentionally rebelled against Nazarick until she was killed by Ainz and later resurrected. Afterward, she ended up blaming herself for her actions, even though she had no control of it; despite her poison resistance, she spent time trying to get drunk. While she has since recovered somewhat, she maintains a constant sense of uncertainty and caution, while also belittling herself.

One of the Guardians of the Sixth floor of Nazarick, alongside her twin brother Mare. She takes on the form of a young Dark Elf who cross-dresses as a boy. She is also very energetic and extroverted, in contrast to her brother. Despite constantly bickering, she is very close to Shalltear, unintentionally mimicking the relationship between their creators. She fights with a whip and bow and can summon beasts to fight by her side. Ainz treats her and her brother as if they were his own children.

One of the Guardians of the Sixth floor of Nazarick alongside his twin sister Aura. He takes on the form of a young Dark Elf who cross-dresses as a girl; though he has no idea what a cross-dresser is. He is also rather shy and calm (although, it is heavily implied, that he is actually just acting) in comparison to his sister, causing him to be constantly ordered around by her. Despite this, however, he can fight and be ruthless when necessary. He specializes in Druid magic, capable of twisting the earth to his whims. Ainz often treats him and his sister as if they were his own children.

The Guardian of the seventh floor of Nazarick as well as the one in charge of its defenses. He takes on the form of a demon dressed in a business suit with glasses and a tail. Demiurge uses verbal to control the actions of others he perceives as being poor-mannered. He is among the most intelligent and evil NPCs of Nazarick, willing to commit unspeakable atrocities to further his goals. While getting along fine with the other Guardians, his relationship with Sebas is more strained due to their opposing natures which were inherited from the guild members who created the two, who were also often at odds. Demiurge constantly believes his schemes were already wished by Ainz, whom he believes only reveals small portions of his true plans to appease the other Guardians' curiosity; Ainz constantly tricks Demiurge into revealing his plan.

The Guardian of the Fifth Floor of Nazarick. He takes on the form of a huge, four-armed, humanoid insect with the power of cryokinesis. He also possesses multiple swords, spears, halberds and other kinds of armaments. He has a warrior personality, which makes him very noble, and respects anyone with a strong fighting spirit. He is in charge of the security of Nazarick and later becomes responsible for the Lizardmen tribes that Ainz had him conquer. Among his fellow Guardians, he is closest to Demiurge, who he sees as a rival and a friend.

The Guardian of the Eight Floor of Nazarick. It holds the appearance of a 1-meter-long, pink fetus, with a halo and stick-like wings. It speaks the Enochian language. It is Nazarick's last line of defense, with its only ability being a self-destruct skill. Despite this, however, it is humble and modest about its function, believing its sole purpose is to serve the members of the guild, Ainz Ooal Gown.

The Guardian of the Fourth Floor. It is a stone golem with a height of over 30m. Unlike the other Floor Guardians, it is not a custom NPC but an in-game bonus won by the guild, Ainz Ooal Gown. As a result, it was not granted any personality or free will upon coming to the New World. Due to its unique nature, it is noted to be the strongest Floor Guardian, but due to its inability to react on its own, its strength falls considerably.

Area Guardians
NPCs that serve as mini-bosses for a specific portion of a floor. Some of them serve as subordinates to the Floor Guardians, while others act outside the chain of command.

The Area Guardian of Nazarick's Treasury, created by Ainz himself. He is a doppelgänger with an egghead with three holes as a face and is dressed in a military officer's uniform. He can also assume the appearance and abilities of every member of the Ainz Ooal Gown guild. Because of this, Ainz occasionally calls on him as a stand-in when situations require both Ainz and Momon to be active at the same time. Despite being an Area Guardian, his abilities rival a Floor Guardian. Because Ainz created him while going through a chuunibyou phase, he programmed him to act with exaggerated gestures and body language, which now greatly embarrasses him. Despite not getting to spend much time together, he and Ainz share a strong bond, with the latter secretly allowing the former to call him "father".

The Area Guardian of the Frozen Prison on Nazarick's fifth floor and Albedo's older sister, being created by the same creator. She specializes in information gathering. While she bears some similarities to Albedo, her face has no skin, resulting in a twisted appearance. Her mind is similarly broken, unless a baby doll is given to her. However, while she has said doll, is actually one of the few NPCs of Nazarick that is genuinely kind-hearted. Despite being polar opposites in appearance and personality, she and Albedo generally get along just fine.

Nazarick's hidden super boss and the Younger sister of Albedo and Nigredo, being created by the same creator. She is the strongest NPC in Nazarick who can overwhelm Ainz and even Touch Me with full equipment. Not much is known about her, but Albedo loves her while Nigredo fears her. Ainz is initially cautious of her because she could turn against them someday but was reassured by Albedo that she is just as loyal as the other NPCs in Nazarick.

Pleiades
A group of NPCs dressed as maids, with the exception of Sebas who looks like a butler. They serve as Nazarick's last line of defense before the final floor. Despite each member, with the exception of Sebas and Aureole, being weak by Nazarick's standards, their strength is equivalent to legendary monsters in the New World. Despite their appearance, however, they are actually terrible at being maids, being more so seen as a sort of idol group by Nazarick's denizens.

The head butler of Nazarick and overseer of the Pleiades. Despite not being a Floor Guardian, his abilities rival theirs, specializing in unarmed combat. He takes on the form of an elderly gentleman with a neat beard. Unlike the other NPCs, he doesn't hate outsiders and actually has a strong sense of justice, like his creator. Because of this, he has a habit of saving those in need, often bringing him in conflict with other NPCs and, on occasion, calling his loyalty to Ainz into question. He especially doesn't get along with Demiurge. In the Isekai Quartet crossover series, he is portrayed as a school staff member.

The Vice-Captain, but the de facto leader of the Pleiades. She is a Dullahan who uses a choker to keep her head attached to the rest of her body, causing her to appear to be human. She specializes in unarmed combat and uses Gauntlets in battle. She is programmed to behave like a teacher because her creator was one, and the other Pleiades look up to her like a big sister. She holds a neutral stance towards humans, not disliking them but not helping them out either.

One of the Pleiades. She's a werewolf in human form and serves as the group's healer. In public, she is a sociable and friendly person who likes to make lewd jokes. However, in reality, she is a psychopath who enjoys using her healing abilities to slowly torture others to death. She is later assigned by Ainz to protect Carne Village. She is the only known NPC to get Ainz angry for not doing her job properly.

One of the Pleiades. She is a Doppelgänger. However, because all her levels went into her combat abilities, she is permanently in human form. Instead, she is the strongest of the Pleiades, being a magic caster that specializes in lightning spells. She serves as Ainz's companion while under his "Momon" identity, going by the alias . However, she despises and looks down on humans, which often causes trouble for him. While as an adventurer, she was given the nickname "The Beautiful Princess" due to her appearance. Many men proposed to her but most people think she is either Momon's lover or servant. Some members of the Pleiades are jealous of her due to the closeness she has with Ainz during her adventuring days with him.

One of the Pleiades. She's an automaton who fights using guns and war knives and widely favors long-range combat. While silent and emotionless, she holds no particular dislike towards humans. She is the only one who knows how to unlock the doors of Nazarick, both secret and public.

One of the Pleiades. She is a Slime that takes on a human form. She is an assassin and can absorb people and objects into her body to be stored or devoured. Being a Slime, she preys on humans and generally despises and looks down on them.

One of the Pleiades. She is an Insectoid who disguises herself as a human by wearing a mask and changing her voice. She is an entomancer, being able to summon fellow Insectoids. Being an Insectoid, she preys on humans when hungry, but otherwise doesn't consider them worth her attention. She harbors a grudge towards Evileye from the Adventurer Group Blue Roses, who defeated and humiliated her. Her wish is to get revenge on Evileye by killing her and eating her then finally take her voice as payback for destroying hers. She is called the "Predator of Family" because she eats Kyouhukou's family sometimes as a snack, making him greatly afraid of her.

The secret seventh member of the Pleiades as well as the group's true leader and the Area Guardian of the region known as the Cherry Blossom Sanctuary. Due to her dual positions, she is unable to lead the group most of the time, causing Yuri Alpha to serve as the leader in her stead. She is in charge of Nazarick's Teleportation Gates and the only human NPC in the tomb. Ainz seems to trust her a great deal, entrusting her with the Staff of Ainz Ooal Gown whenever he leaves Nazarick.

Five Worst
An unofficial group composed of the five most disgusting NPCs of Nazarick. Each member has something that is considered "the worst".

The Area Guardian of a region known as the "Black Capsule", which is filled with carnivorous cockroaches, and a member of Five Worst, holding the title "Worst Residence". He has the appearance of a 30cm tall Cockroach that walks on its hind legs and wears a small crown as well as a cloak with a small scepter, giving the impression that he is the king of cockroaches. Despite his appearance, he speaks politely with all the etiquette of a Gentleman.

The Area Guardian of a region known as the "Large Hole" and a member of Five Worst, holding the title of "Worst Appearance". It is a parasitic creature, using humans as a "House". It and its family are currently residing inside of Hekkeran and Imina, two of the members of Foresight who were defeated and killed during their attempted raid on Nazarick.

Nazarick's investigator/torturer and a member of Five Worst, holding the title "Worst Occupation". She is a visibly hideous creature who speaks in a seductive and teasing tone that loses any appeal due to her similarly hideous voice. She also holds affection for Ainz, causing him to avoid her.

Nazarick's musical instructor and a member of Five Worst, holding the title "Worst Personality". He views humans as food or toys and requested Ainz for it and commands several Greater Doppelgängers.

9th-Floor
The NPCs who work as personnel on Nazarick's 9th floor. Being only created as part of the scenery, most of them are only level 1, with no noteworthy abilities.

The Head-Maid of Nazarick. She has the body of a human but the head of a Shetland Sheepdog with a vertical scar on her face running down the center of her face. She harbors no dislike towards humans and is even willing to rescue them from her fellow NPCs' cruelty. Unlike most of the 9th-floor inhabitants, she has actual abilities, specializing in healing and resurrection magic, though the latter requires gold coins, jewelry, and/or other valuable goods as a cost.

The assistant butler of Nazarick under Sebas. He takes on the form of a rockhopper penguin that faintly resembles a bulter. He has been programmed to have a superiority complex and a desire to take over Nazarick as a gag by his creator. However, he does not want to overthrow Ainz, instead deluding himself into believing that he will simply be promoted to the position if he works hard. Nazarick's other inhabitants are fully aware of his ambitions, as he constantly brags about it, but they do not care as they know that it is only part of his settings and he poses no threat, with their opinions on him ranging from silent ridicule to annoyance.

Nicknamed Sous-Chef. He is a mushroom man dressed as a barkeep who runs a bar on Nazarick's 9th floor. He is a calm and soothing individual who tries his best to help his customers through their troubles, causing the tomb's denizens to often turn to him with their worries. Still, he has standards, disliking slothiness and sloppiness.

Nazarick's head chef who works on the tomb's 9th floor and provides meals to the denizens there. He is a bipedal boar-like monster dressed as a kook. He has a fanatical pride in his profession and constantly declares this.

Supreme Beings
Ainz's former comrades and the members of the Ainz Ooal Gown guild whom the NPCs now revere as gods due to them being their creators. Unfortunately, they all eventually quit the guild and YGGDRASIL as a whole in order to focus on their careers and family problems in the real world. Only Herohero bothered to log in on the last day of the game.

An honorable and just man, who recruited Momonga into the original Nine's Own Goal; he is also the creator of Sebas. It's his doctrine "Helping others is just common sense" that helps Ainz keep a scrap of humanity as an undead. His avatar name was a challenge to attempt to land a blow on him; Ainz confirmed Touch never lost a single bout.

Creator of Cocytus. Also known as "Warrior Takemuchizuki"; he was weapon hoarder, who gave Cocytus most of his weapons.

Creator of Demiurge. He was known for his love of the macabre; with his twisted thinking reflected in Demiurge's own artistry. Much like how Demiurge and Sebas argue over what to do, Ulbert did so with Touch Me; albeit because Touch was more practical.

Creator of Shalltear and Bukubukuchagama's IRL brother. He was a MASSIVE pervert who loved eroge.

Creator of Marie and Aura; she cross dressed them due to a fondness for "traps". She is a voice actress IRL and Peroroncino's sister. According to Perororncino, she even voiced in an eroge game her brother bought; which was awkward. 

The only other member of the guild to log in on YGGDRASIL's final day; his avatar is a slime.

Creator of Albedo. He had a ridiculous fondness for complexity. His original setting for Albedo was that she was a slut; before Momonga changed it as a joke to have her in love with him instead.

A member of the guild who believed beating others up was the best way to get them to listen. 

Member of the guild who loved pranks. One of his latent ones gets triggered in the bath when Shalltear tries to peep.

New World

Nazarick's Allies

A giant female Hamster with a snake-like tail that lived in the forest near Carne Village. She was thought to be the strongest beast among the forest denizens. While publicly known as "The Wise King of the Forest", she's actually more-or-less a dense idiot, though she is capable of human speech. Upon learning about her, Momon (Ainz' Adventurer persona) seeks her out to increase his fame. Upon finding her, however, he is extremely disappointed, not understanding what others see in her, and proceeds to easily defeat her. He then promptly tames her and names her "Hamsuke". She then joins Ainz's adventurer group as his registered beast and totally devotes herself to him. While initially arrogant due to being strong by the New World's standards, upon meeting Nazarick's NPCs, she realizes her weakness and devotes herself to becoming stronger. Some of her dialogue sounds similar to Yoda.

Nazarick's newest apprentice-maid under Sebas Tian's supervision. She was a slave of Eight Fingers until Sebas found and saved her while on a mission. He nursed her back to health and she slowly opened up to him, eventually even developing a crush on him. However, this brought Sebas' loyalty to Ainz into question, and they were both forced to appear before him. Learning about Ainz didn't change her feelings towards Sebas however, as she was willing to let him kill her to prove his loyalty. Luckily, this was merely a test, and her life was spared. She was then revealed that be the older sister of Ninya Berion, whom Ainz felt indebted, causing him to take her under his protection. As of now, she remains unaware of her younger sister's passing.

Carne Village
A small village located at the Re-Estize Kingdom's eastern border, close to where Nazarick resides. The villagers became loyal to Ainz after he saved them from an attack by the Slane Theocracy. As a result, they sided with Nazarick when it went to war with the Re-Estize Kingdom and later became part of the newly founded nation. The village has since started to take in other races including Goblins, Ogres, and Dwarves.

A girl from the Carne Village who was saved by Ainz from soldiers of the Sunlight Scripture. Ainz gives her 2 Goblin-Summoning Horns that she would eventually use to protect her village. Enri shares a close bond with her childhood friend, and lover after the events of the 8th light novel, Nfirea. She and all the other villagers admire and respect Ainz for saving them from Nigun, and willingly leave the Kingdom when the crown prince attempt to force them into joining the fight against Ainz in the 9th novel. Carne Village becomes part of Ainz' territory once he wins the war. It is revealed in the 11th light novel that she and Nfirea have gotten married and moved into their own house. All Goblins she summoned regard her as "General Enri" and are more than willing to attack anything that they think threatening her safety, even entity as strong as Lupusregina. Stronger than her own husband both in physique and sexual vigor, it's implied by Ainz's monologue in the 10th novel, that she often asks her husband for sex, so much so that it forces him to create some sort of Viagra substance to satisfy her.

A girl from the Carne Village and Enri's younger sister who was saved by Ainz from soldiers of the Sunlight Scripture. When Enri and Nfirea are invited to Nazarick for dinner she joins them. She is amazed by Ainz's wealth and the beauty of Nazarick, which amuses Ainz greatly and he personally shows her most of the tomb. Ainz adds her name to the list of Carne people that Lupusregina must protect even at the cost of her own life afterward. It's revealed in the 11th light novel that she moved in with Lizzie after her sister got married.

A famous pharmacist in the city E-Rantel. He is the grandson of Lizzie Bareare and the childhood friend of Enri Emmot. He has an innate talent of being able to use any magic item. Nfirea harbors romantic feelings for Enri, which eventually come to fruition. He manages to create a Purple potion, out of materials from Nazarick and the new world, which works better than the blue potion but still less than YGGDRASIL's Red Potion. Ainz is pleased with this step forward but hopes that he can at least make this kind of potion out of materials from the New World. Nfirea is also one of the only residents in the New World that knows Momon's true identity as Ainz. It is revealed in the 11th light novel, that Nfirea and Enri have gotten married and are living in their own house.

The brash and often short-tempered leader of the vigilante committee of Carne Village and a former iron-ranked adventurer. Brita first encountered "Momon" (Ainz's alias as an adventurer) when he accidentally destroyed her potion in a tavern. Ainz decides to give her a special red potion to make up for her loss. This potion ends up saving her life during Shalltear's rampage since it made the vampire interrogate her instead of just killing her. She quits being an adventurer after encountering Shalltear and moves to Carne Village, where she ends up assisting the people. She also joins the Villagers in fighting against the Kingdom and for Ainz in the 9th Novel.

Nfirea's grandmother, is considered the best pharmacist in E-Rantel. Lizzie's most notable traits are that she is often demanding and fastidious. When Nfirea is captured by Clementine, she gives up "everything" to Momon in order to save him. She and Nfirea are then later sent to Carne Village where they are told to create a Red Potion from Yggdrasil.

Lizardmen
A demi-human species that have shared human and reptilian characteristics. They live in a tribal-like society with five known tribes: Green Claw, Red eye, Dragon Tusk, Razor Tail, and Small Fang. Nazarick attempted to massacre them to solidify their control over the region. However, the Floor Guardian overseeing the operation, Cocytus, developed respect for them, causing Ainz to subjugate them instead. After being resurrected by Ainz and witnessing the amazing and impossible feats of power and magic, they made a statue of Ainz and started worshipping him as a god.

A Lizardman of Green Claw and younger brother of Shasryu. He wields the ice sword "Frost Pain". He once left his tribe to explore the world but returned with knowledge about cultivating fish. He is the one who manages to unify all the Lizardman tribes to fight against Ainz. While doing this, he also meets Crusch Lulu, who later becomes his wife. He, along with the other lizardmen, managed to beat Ainz's first attack and later faced Cocytus, being the last one remaining before being slain. However, Crush requests Ainz to resurrect him. Afterward, he came to view Ainz as a god and swore servitude to him. He later becomes a father to an Albino Lizardman.

The elder brother and Chieftain of Green Claw. He is among the few Lizardmen to fight against Cocytus and be revived. He and his brother are very caring of each other.

The wife of Zaryusu Shasha and acting Chieftain of Red Eye. She is an Albino, which normally would entail abandonment at birth, but she was kept and raised by her parents. She is a powerful magic user. During a famine, her father, the chief, committed Fratricide to prevent the death of his people. Unable to bear the shame, Crusch, arranged an uprising, which was successful, passing the mantle of the chief to her. She and Zaryusu meet when he comes to ask for an alliance between Lizardmen, and they fall in love, when he, while infatuated by her beauty, lets out a mating cry for her. They eventually become closer and marry and even have a son, who is an albino. She becomes a representative for the Lizard people, after the fight against Cocytus. She meets Ainz, talking to him in fear and respect, and he offers to bring back Zaryusu in return for her acting as an informant to him, for any sign of rebellion. She is the most powerful magic caster among the lizardmen, but due to her skin, she is extremely vulnerable to the sun, making her wear a ridiculous bush outfit whenever she goes out during the day. She is still fearful of Ainz, as when he inquires about the child she fears he might take him away.

Zenberu is the chieftain of the Dragon Tusk Tribe. After Zaryusu proves his strength in a duel against him, he becomes his close companion. Bigger than the average Lizardman, his most outstanding feature are his asymmetrical arms; his right arm is much bigger and more muscular than his left. Like Zaryusu, he was also a Traveler.

Kyuku is the chieftain of the Razor Tail Tribe. He wears an enchanted armor that increases his strength, but suppresses his intelligence, making him speak in short, coarse sentences.

Sukyu is the chieftain of the Small Fang Tribe. He is known as the best ranger among all the lizardmen.

Eight Fingers
A crime syndicate within the Re-Estize Kingdom that effectively controls the entire nation from the shadows. They came into conflict with Nazarick after Sebas saved one of their slaves, Tuareninya, causing Ainz to order their destruction. However, Demiurge saw a use for them and instead took control of the organization.

The Leader of the Drug Department within Eight Fingers. She was once a prostitute and got her current position by manipulating the nobles she slept with. She was the first Eight Fingers member to be abducted and tortured by Nazarick. Afterward, she swore servitude to them out of fear and sold out the remainder of Eight Fingers. The trauma of her torture also caused her to lose the ability to eat solid food. After seeing Ainz is a just and benevolent ruler, especially after having deal the psychotic Albedo, Hilma's trauma heals some; becoming genuinely loyal to Ainz.

The Leader of the Slave Trade Department within Eight Fingers. He is noted to be gay. After being beaten by Climb and Brain, he was taken into custody by the Re-Estize Kingdom. During Eight Fingers evacuation of the kingdom, he is rescued and sent to be tortured into being loyal to Nazarick.

Six Arms
Eight Fingers' security department. The group was disbanded after all its members were either killed or taken into custody.

The Leader of Six Arms titled "Battle Demon". He specializes in unarmed combat and possesses a skill that temporally grants him the abilities of animals he killed. He developed a one-sided rivalry with Sebas after he humiliated the group, causing him to abduct Tsuareninya to lure him into a trap. He later fought Climb and Brain while the other members dealt with Sebas. However, Sebas arrived, having killed the other members, and killed him after enduring his strongest attack.

A member of Six Arms titled "Phantom Demon". He fights using a combination of sword skills and illusions. While guarding Cocco Doll, he ended up in a fight with Climb and Brain, where the latter defeated him. He was subsequently taken into custody by the Re-Estize Kingdom. However, he was later broken out and given a chance to redeem himself only to once again be defeated, this time by Climb. Afterwards, he was presumably recaptured.

An Elder-Lich and a member of Six Arms titled the "Undying King". He possesses several magic items and, unlike most undead, is able to suppress his natural disdain towards the living. Upon learning of his title, Sebas became enraged and instantly killed him, as he thought of it as an insult towards Ainz.

The sole female member of Six Arms titled "Dancing Scimitar". She possesses a set of the floating swords that she can control telepathically along with an ability that allows her to use every part of her body independently from the others. She was killed by Sebas when he decapitated her at such speed that she wasn't even aware she had died.

A member of Six Arms titled "Spacial Slash". He fights using an extremely thin sword that is closer to a whip and possesses a technique called "Dimension Slash", which is actually just a normal sword slash that is difficult to see due to its speed and the thinness of his sword. He was killed by Sebas after he effortlessly blocked his technique.

A member of Six Arms titled "Thousand Kills". He possesses a rapier that can kill most people in one hit, though his own skills aren't that impressive. After Sebas killed all other members of the group and effortlessly blocked his rapier, he became hysterical until the former put him out of his misery.

Baharuth Empire
A Human nation east of Nazarick. It is an absolute monarchy state, ruled by an emperor. It also has annual territorial skirmishes with the Re-Estize Kingdom. They were the first nation to make contact with Nazarick. Fearing their power, the Emperor accepted the tomb as an independent nation while attempting to rally other human nations against it, but this failed. As a result, the Empire submitted to Nazarick and became a vassal state.

The current Emperor of the Baharuth Empire. He is a calm and pragmatic person who purges anyone who gets in his way and replaces them with whomever he sees as more fitting, earning him the nickname "Bloody Emperor". Upon learning about Ainz, he intended to turn him into his pawn. To do so, he sent several Workers into Nazarick and blame the Re-Estize Kingdom. However, his scheme was seen through and he was forced to travel to the tomb to apologize to Ainz. Upon seeing the power of Nazarick, he proposed an alliance to prevent them from attacking the Empire. He planned on forming an alliance with the other human nations against Nazarick, but they abandoned him. Afterward, the Emperor gave up and submitted to Ainz. 

He constantly overestimates Ainz, believing him to be some genius chess master; instead of a guy winging it to cover up his subordinates' screw ups.

The imperial court wizard of the Empire and one of the strongest Magic casters in the New World. His only desire is to peer into the void of magic and he is willing to betray anyone to get there. Upon meeting Ainz and seeing his tenth-tier magic aura, he immediately swore loyalty to him. Ainz keeps Fluder baited by explaining his "teachings" include translating the YGGDRASIL books; claiming new magic must be earned, rather than handed over.

Dwarf Kingdom
A nation of Dwarves that resides inside the Azerlisia Mountain range, located to the north of Nazarick. They are a mobile nation mostly composed of miners, with everything that is mined belonging to the state. Ainz struck a trade deal with the nation in return for retaking their former capital, which was being occupied by Frost Dragons and a demi-human species known as the Quagoa.

Gondo, is a Miner, craftsman, and explorer. His appearance is somewhat typical, short, with a long beard, wearing coarse overalls and a metal helmet. He is somewhat anti-social, as seen in his lack of enthusiasm when it comes to relaxing with friends, but he is not introverted. He holds a sense of guilt due to his inability to use or make runes, something his father and grandfather had. He still persists with his low abilities, and hopes to one day revive runecraft, and is willing to do anything so that it does not die out. He and all the other runesmiths of the Dwarf Kingdom have been given to the Sorcerer Kingdom as per the treaty between the nations, for Ainz's attempt to learn and understand runes. He and the other runesmiths were taken to and are presently residing in Carne Village, where they are working in secret. Not even the villagers know what they are doing.

Frost Dragons
A subspecies of dragons that inhabit the Azerlisia Mountains. Attempting to build a "Frost Dragon Empire", they took the Dwarf Kingdom's former capital as a nesting ground. Ainz confronted them to reclaim the capital as part of a trade deal with the Dwarves and they ended up swearing loyalty to him out of fear after he killed their patriarch.

A frost dragon and son of the Frost Dragon Lord. Unlike most dragons, who are brute and violent, he has a more scholarly attitude. Due to constant reading, he has weak eyesight, causing him to wear a pair of spectacles. He is also fat and timid to the point of cowardness. When Ainz invaded his family's home, he was sent by his father stopped him. However, he realized he was no match for the undead and surrendered. After Ainz killed his father, he convinces him to spare the remainder of his family.

He is currently Aura's pet.

Quagoa
A race of mole-like demi-humans inhabiting the Azerlisia Mountains that were waging war against the Dwarf Kingdom. Unfortunately for them, Ainz interfered in the conflict as part of a trade deal with the Dwarves and he had Aura and Shalltear massacre them. Afterward, the survivors swore servitude to Ainz to guarantee their survival.

The king of the Quagoa who united all the tribes beneath him. He had great ambitions for his people, wishing for them to become the sole rulers of the Azerlisia Mountains. To this end, he waged war against the Dwarfs and forged an alliance with the Frost Dragons. However, this "alliance" was little more than the Quagoa being the Frost Dragons' servants, causing the king to conspire against them. When Aura and Shalltear appeared before him and told him to surrender, the king was too stunned by the seemingly ridiculous demand to answer. As a result, he had to watch as the pair massacred his brethren. With his spirit broken, he swore servitude to Ainz.

Abelion Hills
A vast wilderness inhabited by all kinds of Demi-Human tribes who are constantly attempting to invade the neighboring Roble Holy Kingdom. Jaldabaoth (Demiurge in disguise) conquered the Abelion Hills and forced its inhabitants to attack the Holy Kingdom. Ainz later laid claim to the region, officially making it part of the Nazarick. Unaware to anyone, however, this was Demiurge's plan all along.

The prince of the Zern. He was taken captive by the demi-human alliance, forcing the Zern to fight on their behalf. However, he was later rescued by Neia Baraja and CZ2128 Delta under orders of the Holy Kingdom Liberation Army, who the Zern had made a deal with. Afterwards, he and the surviving Zern found refuge with Nazarick. However, he later returned to aid the Liberation Army in their final battle against the Demi-Human Alliance, leading an arm of his people under the command of Ainz.

The ruler of the Bafolk Tribes, a race sheep-like beastman, and a member of Demiurge's army. He was infamous for having killed many Holy Kingdom soldiers. After the alliance laid siege to the Northern Holy Kingdom, he and his people were tasked with guarding a city and were eventually attacked by the Holy Kingdom Liberation Army, where he faced off against Ainz. Upon realizing he was no match for him, however, he offered his loyalty to him. However, Ainz was disgusted by his habit of wearing child skulls as trophies and killed him.

The ruler of the Zoastia, a race of tiger-like beastman, and a member of Demiurge's army. He had a warrior mindset, only caring about fighting strong opponents. When the Holy Kingdom Liberation Army retook a city, he was part of a force sent to recapture it. While initially having the upper hand against the Liberation Army, he was killed by Ainz when he took to the front lines.

The ruler of the Magelos, a race of Demi-Humans with four arms, and a member of Demiurge's army. She admired only strength and desired to sire the offspring of Jaldabaoth (Demiurge in disguise). When the Holy Kingdom Liberation Army retook a city, she was part of a force sent to recapture it. While initially having the upper hand against the Liberation Army, she was killed by Ainz when he took to the front lines.

The ruler of the Stone Eaters, a race of Demi-Humans who eat stones and take on their properties, and a member of Demiurge's army. When the Holy Kingdom Liberation Army retook a city, he was part of a force send to recapture it. While initially having the upper hand against the Liberation Army, he was killed by Ainz when he took to the front lines.

Adventurers
Members of the international Adventurers Guild, are essentially glorified mercenaries whose work primarily involves hunting monsters and escorting people.

Swords of Darkness
An adventurer group based in the Re-Estize Kingdom. They joined Momon (Ainz's Adventurer persona) on his first mission while infiltrating the Adventurers Guild. Unfortunately, all members were later killed by Clementine and Khajiit, effectively disbanding the group.

Leader and Warrior of the Swords of Darkness. He is later killed and turned into a zombie by Khajiit along with Lukrut and Dyne.

Ranger of the Swords of Darkness. When he meets Nabe for the first time, he immediately falls in love with her, much to her disgust, but even so he remains undeterred. He is later killed and turned into a zombie by Khajiit along with Peter and Dyne.

Magic caster and strategist of the Swords of Darkness. Her dream was to get one of the swords of darkness, but she prioritized finding her older sister, who was taken by a noble. She is later brutally tortured to death by Clementine. She masquerades as a man in order to maintain respect amongst her peers, a fact that Ainz and Nabe discovered when they found her body. Her sister is later saved by Sebas and taken into Nazarick by Ainz, as a repayment for the knowledge he obtained about the new world from Ninya's Diary.

Druid of the Swords of Darkness. He is later killed and turned into a zombie by Khajiit along with Peter and Lukeluther.

Blue Roses
An all-female Adventurer Group based in the Re-Estize Kingdom. They were regarded as the Kingdom's strongest adventure group until Darkness arrived.

Born ; she is Blue Roses' magic caster as well as its strongest member. She is actually a vampire (hence why she always wears a mask and cloak) once known as Landfall, who was infamous for destroying the nation Inveria, as well as a former member of the Thirteen Heroes. She is also very prideful and frequently argues with Gagaran, who insults her by calling her "Shorty". She develops a crush on Momon (Ainz' Adventurer persona) after he saved her from Jaldabaoth (Demiurge in disguise). On the other hand, she despises Ainz, not knowing they are the same person. 
She is a main character in the Overlord Bonus Volume, The Vampire Princess of the Lost Country, which takes place in an alternate universe but with a different origin that states she was originally a former princess of the fallen nation, Inveria. She uses her real name instead of an alias and currently travels with Ainz in the New World in search of knowledge on how to turn her back into being human.

The Leader of Blue Roses. She is a young woman who uses faith-based magic, including resurrection magic. She also wields the demonic sword Kilineiram, one of the legendary "Swords of Darkness" held by one of the Thirteen Heroes. However, she claims to have trouble controlling the sword's powers and that it is consuming her; though it is implied that this is actually just her secretly suffering from chuunibyou. She is also close friends with Princess Renner.

A warrior and a member of Blue Roses. She has an extremely muscular and bulky figure, to the point where she barely looks like a woman. However, she doesn't like to talk about it and even seems to want to deny it by giving herself nicknames like "Lovely Warrior Full of Mystery". She also has a somewhat vulgar personality but is often seen as the "big brother" of the team. She is close friends with Climb, often helping him with his training. Aside from all of this, she is also known as the "Cherry Picker", due to her taste in taking a man's virginity.

Blue Roses' twin assassins. They have the exact same features and attire, with the only difference between them being the color of their hair ribbons; Tina's is red whereas Tia's is Blue. They also have a third sister named Tira. They were originally hired to assassinate Lakyus but failed. However, rather than kill them, she instead had them join the group.

Workers
Mercenaries who do similar work as Adventurers but outside of the regulations of the Adventurer Guild. Like Adventurers, they swear allegiance to no nationality.

Foresight
A worker group based in the Baharuth Empire. The members were all decent people who left the Adventurer Guild due to disagreeing with its politics. They were one of four Worker Groups hired to raid Nazarick. Unfortunately, the entire group ended up being killed during their excursion into the tomb.

The Magic Caster of Foresight. She was a prodigy with a talent that allowed her to see a person's magic potential. She was also a former noble after Emperor Jircniv stripped her family of its title. However, her parents, unable to accept this, constantly borrowed money to continue their lavish lifestyle, building up a huge debt. While she initially became a Worker to help pay off the debt, she eventually gave up and planned to run away with her younger sisters. When she and her comrades encountered Ainz while raiding Nazarick, she was the only one to get away, only to be killed by Shalltear instead. Afterward, her voice is taken by Entoma after her original one was destroyed by Evileye.

Her fate in the web novel differs due to fans wishing for her survival upon the author asking for their opinion. Arte ends up Shalltear's toy, until Ainz asks for help to learn about high society; he rewards Arte with a home on the 6th floor, along with her sisters, whom Ainz saved from slavery as a gift. 

The Leader of Foresight. He was expunged from the Adventurers Guild after he got into a fight with a guild master. He fights with several weapons among which are a dagger, a mace, and a hidden blade, but his primary weapon is two swords. He also holds affection for his fellow member of Foresight, Imina. When he and his comrades encountered Ainz while raiding Nazarick, he attempted to trick him by stating they were sent by his "friends", which, knowing they were lying, greatly angered him and caused him to brutally murder him and his comrades.

The Priest of Foresight. He is a kind man, who donates most of his earnings to the needy. He became a worker due to regulations within the Adventurers Guild and the Temple preventing him from healing those who could not pay for it. When he and his comrades encountered Ainz while raiding Nazarick, he survived but was taken captive to be experimented on for faith based magic.

After having his memory altered so many times, he went insane.

The Archer of Foresight. She is a half-elf who generally has a no-nonsense attitude, but she is very kind to her friends. She is also heavily implied to be Hekkeran's lover and a tsundere. When she and her comrades encountered Ainz while raiding Nazarick, Hekkeran sacrificed himself to save her from one of his spells. However, she was eventually killed by Ainz anyway, making his sacrifice in vain.

Dragon Hunt
A Worker Group based in the Baharuth Empire. Their name came from a dragon they slew. They were one of four Worker Groups hired to raid Nazarick. While they didn't enter the tomb, they were all killed by Undead while guarding the entrance, effectively disbanding the group.

The leader of Dragon Hunt. He was a veteran worker who fought with a spear made from a dragon he and his team slew. He also had a very discreet nature, preferring to avoid risks. Because of this, when he and his group were raiding Nazarick, he became suspicious and volunteered his group to guard the entrance. Despite this precaution, however, they were ambushed and killed by a group of Undead.

Heavy Masher
A Worker Group based in the Baharuth Empire. They were one of the four Worker Groups hired to raid Nazarick. The group consisted of fourteen members, but only five were present during the raid on Nazarick. Therefore, the group could still exist, minus the five who died in Nazarick.

The leader of Heavy Masher. He was a short man wearing full body armor who looked more like a dwarf. He also talked in an antiquated style to hide that he's actually incompetent. While raiding Nazarick, his comrades each fell prey the tomb's traps until only he was left. He too was eventually killed when he was transported to Kyouhukou's residence, where he is devoured by Kyouhukou's cockroaches.

Tenmu
A Worker Group based in the Baharuth Empire. While a Group in name, aside from the leader, all other members were his Elven slaves. They were one of four Worker Groups hired to raid Nazarick. The group was disbanded after the leader died. Afterward, because they did not willingly trespass into Nazarick, Ainz spared the Elves and gave them to Aura and Mare.

The Leader of Tenmu. He was a chauvinistic warrior who believed in human superiority, owning Elven slaves whom he constantly abused. He also used them to boost his abilities as well as act as living shields and a personal harem for him. While raiding Nazarick, he was killed by Hamsuke when she used him as a training dummy.

Re-Estize Kingdom
A human nation located west of Nazarick. It was a failed state, with corrupt nobles and crime lords undermining it from within while the Baharuth Empire encroached on its territory. The nation finally fell following two disastrous wars with Nazarick, with the latter absorbing its territories.

King Ramposa III's personal bodyguard. Not wanting a commoner in such a high position, the Kingdom's nobles try to limit his actions. One such case was by preventing him from being knighted. In response to this, the king created a new title just for him: "Warrior Captain", and gave him his own "Warrior Troop" to command. He first met Ainz while investigating the destruction of several villages and came to greatly respect him due to him saving Carne Village. Unfortunately, they later became enemies when the Kingdom and Nazarick went to war with each other. He challenged Ainz to a one-on-one duel where the latter reluctantly killed him. Before his death, he wished not to be resurrected should he lose, so Ainz honored his wish by casting a spell on him that invalidates resurrection.

A warrior turned mercenary who sees himself as Gazef's rival. When Shalltear raided his hideout and slaughtered his men, he found himself terrified and humiliated that Shalltear blocked his strongest technique with her pinky finger. He barely managed to flee the Vampire. After that his will is shattered, stating how the peak of the strongest cannot be climbed by weak beings like humans. He regains his will when he sees Climb withstand the intense killing intent from Sebas, understanding that humans can still change and become stronger. When he re-encounters Shalltear (who does not remember him due to the mind control she faced), he manages to cut the nail on her pinky finger, which reinforces the belief that he can still try to beat her.

The Personal Bodyguard of Princess Renner. She saved him when he was just a street urchin about to die from sickness. As such, he views his services to her as a fulfilling of that debt he owes and is even willing to give up his life for her. However, he remains unaware of Renner's true nature. He is rather disliked due to him having such a position despite not even being a commoner, but an urchin. Despite this position, he holds no talent at fighting, making up for it with sheer effort. He eventually meets Sebas and, after convincing him to teach him some of his skills, they become friends, though he remains unaware of his loyalty towards Ainz. He also has a close friendship with Gazef and Brain as well as several members of Blue Roses.

The Third Princess of the Kingdom. She is publicly known as the Golden Princess due to her great beauty and kindness as well as being a reformer who brought positive changes to the Kingdom. However, in reality, she is a yandere who harbors a demented love for her bodyguard, Climb, which emerged as a result of her overdeveloped mental capacities, causing no-one to understand her until she found him and he began holding onto her every word. While initially merely influencing events behind-the-scenes to increase Climb's reputation, she later sold out the Kingdom to Nazarick in return for a racial change into a demon. She later tricked Climb into becoming one as well, so they can spend eternity together.

The former King of the Re-Estize Kingdom. He was an elderly man who truly cares for his people and struggles to keep his nation united amidst political infighting and invasions by other countries. He also appears to struggle to balance his duties as a king and a father. However, he ultimately proved himself an ineffective ruler and was overthrown by his second son, Zanac, amidst the Kingdom's second conflict with Nazarick before later being killed by his daughter, Renner, during her defection to Nazarick.

The Second Prince of the Re-Estize Kingdom. Despite being the second son, he desires the throne for himself, sparking a rivalry with his older brother, Crown Prince Barbro. While publicly seen as incompetent, he is actually quite intelligent and surrounds himself with powerful allies, like Marquis Raeven. He becomes the new crown prince after his brother is killed during the Kingdom's first conflict with Nazarick and later takes up the role of king regent during the second, after overthrowing his father after deeming him to be inadequate to handle the situation. Unfortunately, he is ultimately assassinated by traitorous nobles who then attempted to surrender to Nazarick by offering his decapitated head a peace offering, which landed on deaf ears.

Often referred to as "Marquis Raeven"; he is one of the highest ranked nobles in the Re-Estize Kingdom. While his public image is that of an opportunist who uses the Kingdom's political infighting to advance his own agenda, he is actually a patriot who uses his influence to prevent the situation from escalating into a civil war. He retired from politics after being traumatized by the events of the Massacre of the Katze Plains. He is later blackmailed by Albedo into assisting Nazarick's war against the Kingdom.

The Crown Prince of the Re-Estize Kingdom. Self-centered and short-tempered, he competed with his younger brother, Zanac, for the throne. Eager to prove himself in the Kingdom's war against Nazarick, he tried to join the effort, but was instead sent to Carne Village to gather information. To make matters worse, talks with the villagers turned violent after he lost his temper and threatened them, resulting in him being driven off by the village's demi-human inhabitants. Afterward, he was ambushed and tortured to death by Lupusregina.

Slane Theocracy
A human nation located south of Nazarick. It was founded over 600 years ago by a group known as the Six Great Gods, who were heavily implied to have been Players. It is the strongest human nation, promoting human supremacy and the persecution of other races.

The captain of the Sunlight Scripture, the Theocracy's demi-human extermination unit. He is highly arrogant and self-righteous, having led many secret genocides against innocent non-humans. He and his Scripture were hired by some corrupt nobles from the Re-Estize to assassinate Gazef Stronoff and would have succeeded if not for Ainz, who effortlessly defeated him. He was then taken captive and is tortured to death by Demiurge.

Black Scripture Captain

The current leader of the Black Scripture, the Theocracy's strongest military unit. He appears to be a young man with long black hair and sharp red eyes. He also wears ornate armor and wields a spear.

A member of the Black Scripture, the Theocracy's strongest military unit. She is a woman suffering from heterochromia, with one side of her hair and eyes being silver and the other half being black. She is also the illegitimate daughter of Elf King Decem Hougan and Faine, a human woman who was known as the "Ace" of the Black Scripture, making her a half-elf. However, she despises her father, rejecting her elven heritage by using her hair to hide her pointy ears. She is arguably the strongest non-dragon inhabitant of the New World, stronger than any of the Pleiades. However, she is still far weaker than the Floor Guardians, being defeated by Mare and taken captive by Nazarick.

Roble Holy Kingdom
A human nation located southwest of the Re-Estize Kingdom. It is a heavily militarized nation, having to constantly focus on defending invasions from the neighboring Albelion Hills, which are inhabited by all kinds of demi-human tribes. Jaldabaoth (Demiurge in disguise) briefly controlled the nation by uniting said tribes into a huge allied army named the Demi-Human Alliance and started invading the country. Fortunately, the inhabitants were able to retake their country with aid from The Sorcerer Kingdom, not knowing they were behind the entire invasion.

A squire and the daughter of Pavel Baraja. She greatly admired her mother, who was a Paladin and thus aspires to be one herself. However, she lacked her mother's talent and was ironically gifted with her father's archery skills instead. She also inherited her father's dark, glaring eyes that often give others a wrong impression of her. Upon meeting Ainz, she became infatuated with his belief that strength is required to protect others and she later becomes his guard after he agrees to aid the Holy Kingdom. During her service to him, Ainz lent her high-level equipment, causing her to be central in liberating the Northern Holy Kingdom. After the liberation, Neia becomes known as the Faceless Preacher and the leader of a cult that worships Ainz, which later ends up taking over the whole northern nation making its creed "Weakness without the drive to improve one’s self is a sin, everyone must strive towards the goal of becoming stronger" the new official religion of the North with Ainz hailed as their new god and idol of worship.

The former bodyguard of the late Holy Queen Calca as well as the elder sister of High-Priestess Kelart and the grandmaster of the Paladin Order. She is also a member of the Nine Colors, holding the title of "White". She is very selfish, highly self-righteous, and driven mainly by her emotions, which often prevents her from making tough decisions that make her an ineffective leader and a general inconvenience to others. After the fall of the Northern Holy Kingdom, she became a captain in the "Holy Kingdom Liberation Army". She holds prejudice toward demi-humans and distrusts Ainz, due to his undead nature, which only grows worse as he earns the citizens' trust and admiration. After the liberation, the new Holy King, Caspond, has her demoted and she is later unceremoniously killed off-page.

The former Holy Queen of the Holy Kingdom as well as the first female monarch in the nation's history. She cared deeply about the well-being of her nation and people and her kindness even extended to non-violent Demi-Humans. She was also a divine-magic prodigy. When Jaldabaoth attacked the Holy Kingdom, she faced him. Unfortunately, she was taken captive by him and literally used as a blunt weapon to beat her soldiers before later dying while in captivity.

The High Priestess of the Holy Kingdom and younger sister of Remedios. Between her and her sister, she is by far the smarter of the two. She is also a powerful magic caster by New World standards. When Jaldabaoth attacked the Holy Kingdom, she was by Holy Queen Calca's side as she faced him, but they were defeated and she was killed, with her head being taken by a demon and used as a magic source.

The current Holy King and the older brother of the Holy Queen Calca. Despite being the elder brother, he gave up his claim to the throne. After Jaldabaoth laid siege to the Northern Holy Kingdom, he was taken prisoner by Demi-Humans until he was rescued by the "Holy Kingdom Liberation Army". Afterward, he took command of the Liberation Army and led it to victory. Unbeknownst to the public, however, the real Caspond is long dead, replaced by a Döppelganger serving Demiurge and is currently working to destabilize the Holy Kingdom.

An adjutant of the Paladin Order. Unlike his superior, Remedios, he is a realist who is willing to compromise if necessary. Due to this, he often serves as an adviser as well as a voice of reason to her. After the liberation, he takes the demoted Remedios' place as the grandmaster of the order.

The current Holy King and the older brother of the Holy Queen Calca. Despite being the elder brother, he gave up his claim to the throne. After Jaldabaoth laid siege to the Holy Kingdom, he was taken prisoner by Demi-Humans until he was rescued by the "Holy Kingdom Liberation Army". Afterward, he took command of the Liberation Army and led it to victory. Unbeknownst to the public, however, the real Caspond is long dead, replaced by a Döppelganger serving Demiurge and is currently working to destabilize the Holy Kingdom.

Neia's father and a soldier in the Holy Kingdom's army. He was an expert archer. He was killed when Jaldabaoth (Demiurge in disguise) attacked the Holy Kingdom.

A corporal in the Holy Kingdom's army. He possessed a unique technique that was so powerful that it would result in his weapon breaking, causing him to carry up to eight swords. He was killed when Jaldabaoth (Demiurge in disguise) attacked the Holy Kingdom.

Others

Thirteen Heroes
Legendary figures in the New World who defeated a group known as the "Evil Deities" (who are strongly implied to have been YGGDRASIL NPCs) 200 years ago. At least two members, including the leader, were Players. Also, despite the name, there were actually more than thirteen members, but the others were not honored due to being non-humans.

A member of the Thirteen Heroes 200 years ago. She is a Necromancer who used her abilities to extend her life beyond natural limits. Despite her age, she maintains a cheerful and mischievous personality. She was also a member of Blue Roses for a while, being the one who transformed it into a top-ranked Adventurer group but retired and forced Evileye to take her place on the team. She sees Nazarick as a great threat to the New World.

Dragon Lords
The most powerful dragons in the New World. As dragons are the strongest species, Dragon Lords are the strongest beings in the New World. However, around 500 years ago, they went to war with a group of Players known as the Eight Greed Kings and lost, resulting in their kind being reduced to a handful.

Also known as the 'Platinum Dragon Lord'; he is a True Dragon Lord presumably the "most powerful being in the New World" and son of the Dragon Emperor. He resides at the castle of the former Eight Greed Kings, guarding their magic items to prevent them from ever falling into the wrong hands. He is also a former member of the Thirteen Heroes and councilor of the Argland Council State. He sees Nazarick as a great threat to the New World. Like his kin, he can use Wild Magic but due to players' intrusion and introduction of Tier-Magic influencing the New World, he can no longer use Wild Magic as well as he use to anymore due to Wild Magic being permanently tainted and twisted caused by the players.

Zurrernorn
A criminal death cult infamous for its uses of necromancy, the Undead, and their obsession with Death. They are led by the Twelve Executives who follow orders from a Night Lich, who is considered the head and founder of the cult and responsible for casting his own created Wild Magic spell called Death Spiral which caused the complete destruction of a small city due to the numerous undead created repeatedly by the ritual. Three of the executives are stronger than Clementine while four of them are at the level of a hero making the cult very deadly and dangerous to deal with. Gargaran, a member of the Blue Roses whose group had past encounters with this cult said they are very dangerous to fight head on especially against one of the twelve executives and she confirmed she and her group are not yet prepared to fight their leaders all while fighting their legions of the Undead.

A rogue warrior and a former member of the Slane Theocracy's Black Scripture. She was a psychopath who wore armor made from medals from Adventurers she has slain. She was not an actual member of Zurrernorn but merely associated with them for protection. She was killed by Momon (Ainz's Adventurer persona) when he crushed her spine. Though her body mysteriously disappeared in the aftermath but luckily for Ainz he was get hold of her equipment and weapons beforehand. Ainz before his battle with the Martial Lord Go Gin felt grateful and thankful for her due to a great deal she learned from her on Martial Arts and was able to keep up with him in terms of fighting in tandem with his magic to aid him for he had mimicked Clementine's fighting style and stance and using her weapons though he had to modify her style to suit his needs, build and play-style.

One of the twelve core members of Zurrernorn. He sought to turn the city of E-Rantel into an undead city to turn himself into an immortal Lich so he could bring her mother back to life who had died from having blood clot in her brain. However, Nabe (Narberal's Adventurer persona) killed him before he could implement his scheme. Like Clementine, his body had also mysteriously disappeared after E-Rantel's officials recovered it and kept it in their morgue.

References

Overlord (novel series)